Bensaïd is an Arabic surname meaning "son of Said" or "descendant of Said". Notable persons with that name include:

Boualem Bensaïd (born 1967), Algerian member of an Islamic terrorist organization
Daniel Bensaïd (1946–2010), French Trotskyist and philosopher
Jean Daniel Bensaid aka Jean Daniel (1920–2020), Algerian-French journalist and author
Samira Bensaïd (born 1960), Moroccan singer

Surnames
Arabic-language surnames
Arab-Jewish surnames
Maghrebi Jewish surnames
Surnames of Moroccan origin
Surnames of Algerian origin
Sephardic surnames
Mizrahic surnames